Kovači (Cyrillic: Ковачи), which translates as Blacksmiths from Serbo-Croatian, refers to the following places:

Bosnia and Herzegovina 

 Kovači, Goražde
 Kovači, Kiseljak
 Kovači, Tomislavgrad
 Kovači, Živinice

Croatia 

 Kovači, Kaštelir-Labinci

Montenegro 

 Kovači, Kotor
 Kovači, Nikšić
 Kovači, Plužine
 Kovač, Pljevlja, earlier Kovači

Serbia 

 Kovači, Kraljevo
 Kovači, Raška
 Kovači, Tutin

See also
 Kovaçi, a surname
 Kovač (disambiguation)
 Kovačić (disambiguation)
 Kovačići (disambiguation)
 Kovačica (disambiguation)
 Kovačice, a village
 Kovačina, a village
 Kovačevo (disambiguation)
 Kovačevac (disambiguation)
 Kovačevci (disambiguation)
 Kovačevići (disambiguation)
 Kováčová (disambiguation)
 Kováčovce, a village